Cochinoca is a rural municipality and village in Jujuy Province in Argentina.

Climate

References

Populated places in Jujuy Province